Efunroye Tinubu ( 1810 – 1887), born Ẹfúnpọ̀róyè Ọ̀ṣuntinúbú, was a powerful Yoruba female aristocrat, merchant, and slave trader in pre-colonial and colonial Nigeria. 

She was a politically and economically influential figure in Lagos during the reigns of Obas (monarchs) Adele, Dosunmu, Oluwole, and Akitoye, helping the latter two Obas gain political power. She married Oba Adele and used his connections to establish a successful trade network with European merchants in slaves, tobacco, salt, cotton, palm oil, coconut oil, and firearms. She allegedly owned over 360 personal slaves.

She sold slaves to Brazilian and European merchants in violation of a 1852 treaty with Great Britain outlawing the slave trade in Lagos. Her economic hegemony over Lagos and secret slave trading resulted in her coming into conflict with British and rival Lagos merchants.  She was exiled to Abeokuta under British pressure after plotting an unsuccessful conspiracy to remove British influence from Lagos. While in Abeokuta, she helped supply the city with munition during its victorious war against the Kingdom of Dahomey, thus earning her the chieftaincy title of the Iyalode of the Egbas.

She died in Abeokuta in 1887. The landmark Tinubu Square in Lagos, Nigeria, was named after her and also has a statue of her. She also has a statue in Abeokuta, Nigeria.

Life and career

Early life
Tinubu was born in the Ojokodo forest area of Egbaland. Her father's name was Olumosa.  She was allegedly of Owu ancestry, either through her maternal or paternal side.
Madam Tinubu was reportedly married multiple times. Her first marriage was to an Owu man. It bore two sons.  After her Owu husband died, she remarried the exiled Oba Adele Ajosun in 1833 who, while visiting Abeokuta, was allegedly charmed by Tinubu. She moved with the exiled Oba to Badagry, which was traditionally the place of refuge for Lagos monarchs. At Badagry, she exploited Adele's connections to build a formidable business trading in tobacco, salt, and slaves.

Lagos
The exiled Oba Adele was still in Badagry when his successor, Oba Idewu, died. Prince Kosoko, Idewu Ojulari's brother, was a major contender for the now vacant throne. Eletu Odibo, the chief 
kingmaker, thwarted Kosoko's aspiration and Adele was invited by him to become Oba again. Tinubu accompanied Adele to Lagos, but the Oba died 2 years later. After Adele's death in 1837, Tinubu reportedly supported Oluwole (her stepson) in his bid for the Obaship of Lagos over that of Kosoko's.

Oba Oluwole had recurring conflicts with Kosoko, who felt that he was the true heir to the throne. Consequently, Kosoko was banished to Ouidah. During Oluwole's reign, Madam Tinubu remarried one Yesufu Bada, alias Obadina, who was Oluwole's war captain and with the support of Oluwole, Tinubu and Yesufu's trading activities in Egbaland grew .

When Oluwole died in 1841, Tinubu supported Akitoye (her brother in law) in his bid for the Obaship over Kosoko's. After Akitoye emerged Oba, he granted Tinubu favorable commercial concessions.  Against the wish of his chiefs, Akitoye invited Kosoko back to Lagos and tried to placate him. Soon thereafter, Kosoko dislodged Akitoye from the throne. Considering Tinubu's alliance with Akitoye, she and other Akitoye supporters fled to Badagry when Kosoko became Oba in 1845. As a wealthy woman, Madam Tinubu was able to influence economic and political decisions during her time in Badagry. She tried to rally Akitoye's supporters to wage war against Kosoko.

In December 1851 and under the justification of abolishing slavery, the British bombarded Lagos, dislodged Kosoko from the throne, and installed a more amenable Akitoye as Oba of Lagos. Though Akitoye signed a treaty with Britain outlawing the slave trade, Tinubu subverted the 1852 treaty and secretly traded slaves for guns with Brazilians and Portuguese traders. Further, she obtained a tract of land from Akitoye which now constitutes part of the present-day Tinubu Square and Kakawa Street. Later, a conflict developed between Tinubu and some slave traders including Possu, a Kosoko loyalist. Consequently, Possu, Ajenia, and other traders tried to instigate an uprising against Akitoye because of Madam Tinubu's influence in Lagos. In the interest of peace, Benjamin Campbell, the British Consul in Lagos, asked Akitoye to exile Tinubu. After Akitoye died, Tinubu returned to Lagos and gave her support to his successor, Dosunmu. Under Dosunmu's reign Tinubu had a massive security force composed of slaves and she sometimes executed orders usually given by the king. As a result, Dosunmu grew wary of her influence in Lagos. A new development was the colonial government's  support for migrants from Brazil and Sierra Leone to settle in Lagos. Many of the migrants, also called Saro and Aguda, were favored by the British in commerce and soon began dominating legitimate trade in Lagos.

In 1855, when Campbell traveled to England, Tinubu tried to influence Dosunmu to limit the influence of the returnees. Dosunmu was noncommittal to her request and consequently, Tinubu was alleged to have played a part in an uprising against the returnees in which her husband, Yesufu Bada, was a major participant. When Campbell returned in 1856, he asked Dosunmu to banish Tinubu. In May 1856, Tinubu was banished to Abeokuta.>

Abeokuta
In Abeokuta, Madam Tinubu traded in arms and supplied Abeokuta with munitions in the war against Dahomey. Her activities in the war earned her the chieftaincy title of the Iyalode of all of Egbaland. While in Abeokuta, she allegedly opposed colonial policies in Lagos. In 1865, a fire engulfed the shops of some traders including some of her properties in Abeokuta. This doesn't appear to have weakened her financially, however. Tinubu became involved in Abeokuta king-making activities as well, supporting Prince Oyekan over Ademola for the Alake of Egbaland's title in 1879. Tinubu appears to have had another marriage with one Momoh Bukar, an Arabic scholar. Momoh's children from other wives later adopted the Tinubu name.

Views on slavery
The often cited biography titled Madame Tinubu: Merchant and King-maker, authored by Nigerian historian Oladipo Yemitan, paints her views regarding slave trading.

Another section of Yemitan's Tinubu biography, referred to as the Amadie-Ojo Affair, captures a slave trading deal gone sour in 1853 (notably after the 1852 Treaty abolishing slavery in Lagos) wherein Tinubu tells another slave trader (Domingo Martinez) that "she would rather drown the slaves [20 in number] than sell them at a discount".

Death and legacy

Tinubu died in 1887 and is buried in Ojokodo Quarters in Abeokuta. Tinubu Square on Lagos Island, a place previously known as Independence Square, is named after her. Ita Tinubu (Tinubu's precinct or Tinubu Square) had long been known by that name before the country's independence, but it was renamed Independence Square by the leaders of the First Republic. A statue of Tinubu stands in Abeokuta.

See also
 Efunsetan Aniwura
 Seriki Williams Abass
 Nigerian chieftaincy

Notes

References
Gloria Chuku, "Tinubu, Efunroye," Dictionary of African Biography, Henry Louis Gates Jr. and Emmanuel K. Akyeampong, eds. (New York: Oxford University Press, 2008)
"Tinubu, Madame (1805-1887)," New Encyclopedia of Africa, John Middleton and Joseph C. Miller, eds., 2nd ed. Vol. 5 (Detroit: Charles Scribner's Sons, 2008)

External links
 Brief Biography

1810 births
1887 deaths
Yoruba women in business
19th-century Nigerian businesspeople
History of women in Lagos
Yoruba royalty
African slave owners
African slave traders
People from colonial Nigeria
Burials in Ogun State
Businesspeople from Lagos
Businesspeople from Abeokuta
Arms traders
Yoruba women in politics
Ologun-Kutere family
History of Lagos
History of Abeokuta
19th-century Nigerian businesswomen
Yoruba queens
Women slave owners